Vasudevanallur is a legislative assembly constituency in Tenkasi district in the Indian state of Tamil Nadu. It is a Scheduled Caste reserved constituency. Elections and winners in the constituency are listed below. It is a part of the Tenkasi Lok Sabha constituency. It is one of the 234 State Legislative Assembly Constituencies in Tamil Nadu, in India.

Demographics 
Devendrakula Velalar, Maravar, Senguntha Mudaliar, Nadar and Yadhava castes are highly concentrated in this constituency.

Madras State

Tamil Nadu

Election Results

2021

2016

2011

2006

2001

1996

1991

1989

1984

1980

1977

1971

1967

References

External links
 

Assembly constituencies of Tamil Nadu
Tirunelveli district